Tomon Fox (born March 16, 1998) is an American football linebacker for the New York Giants of the National Football League (NFL). He played college football at North Carolina and signed with the Giants as an undrafted free agent in 2022.

College career
Fox played at the University of North Carolina from 2016 to 2021. During his collegiate career there he made 47 starts and had 29.5 sacks.  His sack total puts him third on the all-time list at UNC ahead of previous alumnus Lawrence Taylor who also preceded him in playing for the Giants.

Professional career
Fox signed with the New York Giants as an undrafted free agent in 2022.  He was the only undrafted free agent to make the roster at the end of the 2022 pre-season and to make the team's initial 2022 regular season roster. In Week 1 game against the Tennessee Titans Fox got his first career sack on Ryan Tannehill.

References

External links
New York Giants bio
North Carolina Tar Heels bio

1998 births
Living people
American football linebackers
American football defensive ends
North Carolina Tar Heels football players
New York Giants players